Zhang Miao (born 12 August 1988) is a Chinese cyclist. He competed in keirin and the men's individual and team sprint at the 2012 Summer Olympics in London.

References

1988 births
Living people
Chinese male cyclists
Cyclists at the 2012 Summer Olympics
Olympic cyclists of China
People from Binzhou
Chinese track cyclists
Cyclists from Shandong
Asian Games medalists in cycling
Cyclists at the 2010 Asian Games
Universiade medalists in cycling
Medalists at the 2010 Asian Games
Asian Games gold medalists for China
Asian Games bronze medalists for China
Universiade bronze medalists for China
Medalists at the 2011 Summer Universiade
21st-century Chinese people